Asociația Sportivă Ardealul 2013 Târgu Mureș, commonly known as ASA Târgu Mureș or simply as Târgu Mureș, was a Romanian professional football club based in Târgu Mureș, Mureș County, which last played in the Liga II. During its short ten-year history, the team managed several notable domestic performances.

Originally founded in 2008 as FCM Târgu Mureș, it changed its name five years later to ASA Târgu Mureș. The new acronym and the red and blue equipment were meant to closely resemble the identity of one of the former clubs in the city, which was dissolved in 2005. ASA Târgu Mureș won its first major trophy after defeating FC Steaua București in the 2015 Supercupa României, having earned its place in the competition after coming second in the Liga I championship the previous campaign.

Roș-albaștrii recorded their only European appearance in the 2015–16 edition of the UEFA Europa League, when they were eliminated by Saint-Étienne in the third qualifying round. In January 2018, the club announced its withdrawal from the second division after a period marked by insolvency and financial problems, announcing a future reorganization from the summer of that year.

History

Early years
The team was founded in 2008 as FCM Târgu Mureș, becoming the city's main football team, as a successor to CS Târgu Mureș (dissolved in 1960), Mureșul Târgu Mureș (dissolved in 1964), and the original ASA Târgu Mureș (dissolved in 2005). They bought a spot from the newly promoted Unirea Sânnicolau Mare, consequently playing in the 2008–09 Liga II. FCM outperformed the predictions and played well throughout the season, winning 16 games and drawing 9, while scoring 54 goals and receiving 27, the fewest in the Seria II. At the end of the season, the team was very close to promote to the Liga I, finishing third with 57 points.

The following season, the club finished first in their series with 69 points, winning 20 games, drawing 9 and losing 3. The team scored 52 goals and received 20 (the fewest goals received in their series, like the year before) and was promoted for the first time in its history to the Liga I. Eighteen years had passed since the city's last presence in the Romanian top football league (1991–92 season with ASA).

Promotion to Liga I
FCM debuted in Liga I by finishing 9th in the table, the same number of points as the defending champions, CFR Cluj, and Astra Ploiești. Ioan Ovidiu Sabău led the team to a fantastic streak, at ten points behind Gaz Metan Mediaș, the last team who took an UEFA Europa League spot.

The next season, the club failed to maintain its position in the Liga I, finishing 15th, the highest place in the relegation zone. One team from the second division, Politehnica Timișoara, did not receive its licence for the first league, so the Romanian Football Federation had to decide whether to keep the first team under the relegation line, FCM Târgu Mureș, or to promote the team placed third in the Seria II, behind Timișoara. Finally, the FRF decided that Gaz Metan Severin should be promoted, thus FCM ended up being relegated.

Return to Liga II

The board of directors fixed as an objective for the 2012–13 season the promotion back to the Liga I.
However, the team couldn't keep the rhythm set by Corona Brașov and ACS Poli Timișoara, and after the first half of the season it was behind the earlier mentioned two in the league table. The second half of the season was even worse, FCM ending fifth in the West Division of Liga II, ten points behind ACS Poli, which took the second promoting place.

Name change and back to first division
In 2013, the club changed its name from Fotbal Club Municipal Târgu Mureș to Asociația Sportivă Ardealul 2013 Târgu Mureș. At the end of 2013–14 Liga II they finished second and entered Liga I for the first time with the new name.

2014–15 season
On 16 July 2014, the team debuted in Cupa Ligii, Romania's secondary club football tournament, and lost their first ever match in the competition against CSMS Iași. It was an extraordinary season for "The Red-Blues", securing their very first qualification in a European competition, by finishing second, and winning against two-time defending champions Steaua București both home and away. After the away victory over Steaua, Târgu Mureș seized the first place and was close to obtain a historical league title, however, after a 1–3 loss to Astra Giurgiu, the team fell back to the second place. However, Târgu Mureș kept chances to winning the championship after Steaua's 0–0 draw against CSMS Iași, having to win against relegated Oțelul Galați. Mureș side went to a 1–0 lead, but lost the title after Oțelul turned the score to 1–2.

2015–16 season
On 9 July 2015, Târgu Mureș earned a spot in the Supercupa României as championship runners-up last season. The club faced FC Steaua București, which won the domestic treble (Championship, Cup and League Cup), and defeated them 1–0, after a goal scored in the 63rd minute by Mircea Axente, who also received the "Man of the Match" award. This was the club's first major trophy. The team was led by manager Dan Petrescu, who resigned after only one match, due to the financial problems which had appeared in recent days. Shortly after, Vasile Miriuță was revealed as the new coach.

On July 17, it was announced that Târgu Mureș would face AS Saint-Étienne in the UEFA Europa League third qualifying round. The club only managed to win the second leg in France 2–1, and was eliminated after 2–4 on aggregate. Târgu Mureș signed former Romanian international Adrian Mutu for the latter half of the 2015–16 season, being his last team of his playing career.

Chronology of names

Honours

Domestic

Leagues
Liga I
Runners-up (1): 2014–15
Liga II
Winners (1): 2009–10
Runners-up (1): 2013–14

Cups
Supercupa României
Winners (1): 2015

Other performances

Domestic
Appearances in Liga I: 4
Appearances in Cupa Ligii: 2
Semi-finalists of 2015–16 Cupa României

European
Appearances in European Competitions: 1
Biggest European win: 2–1 AS Saint-Étienne in (2015–16 season)
Third qualifying round of 2015–16 UEFA Europa League

European record 

Notes for the table below:

 3Q: Third qualifying round

League history

References

External links 

 
 ASA 2013 Târgu Mureș at UEFA
 ASA 2013 Târgu Mureș at LPF

 
Association football clubs established in 2008
Association football clubs disestablished in 2018
Defunct football clubs in Romania
Football clubs in Mureș County
Liga I clubs
Liga II clubs
Târgu Mureș
2008 establishments in Romania
2018 disestablishments in Romania